Jiří Kobza (born 27 December 1955) is a Czech politician, civil servant, businessman and former diplomatic attaché.

Kobza studied geography at Charles University followed by postgraduate studies at the Prague University of Economics and Business. He lived and worked in various countries in the Middle East specializing in the export of geological works before providing development assistance to the Czech Ministry of Foreign Affairs, covering disasters such as the 2010 Haiti earthquake.

As a youth, he was a member of the Communist Party of Czechoslovakia prior to the end of the Cold War. In 2015, he became a member of the national-conservative Freedom and Direct Democracy (SPD) and in 2017 was elected to the Chamber of Deputies for the Prague constituency. Kobza caused a minor stir when he published a blog and a pamphlet instructing the public on how to defend themselves against the Islamization of the Czech Republic.

References 

Living people
1955 births
20th-century Czech businesspeople
21st-century Czech businesspeople
21st-century Czech politicians
Freedom and Direct Democracy MPs
Politicians from Prague
Anti-Islam sentiment in Europe
Members of the Chamber of Deputies of the Czech Republic (2017–2021)
Members of the Chamber of Deputies of the Czech Republic (2021–2025)
Charles University alumni
Prague University of Economics and Business alumni